Matteo Botteri, (1808 – 1877) also known as Matija Botteri, was a botanist, ornithologist, and collector.

Biography
Botteri was born on the Croatian island Hvar to an Italian family. He began his early career in Dalmatia and nearby Turkey with flora and fauna, primarily ichthyologist investigations, while headquartered in Hvar. He, along with his contemporary , sent materials to Georg von Frauenfeld for his studies. He also sent material to Friedrich Kützing. In 1854, he travelled to Mexico to collect plants on behalf of the Royal Horticultural Society. He settled in Orizaba, where he founded a museum and became professor of languages and natural history at Orizaba College.

Philip Sclater commemorated him in the name of the Botteri's sparrow, which Botteri collected as well as other birds in Veracruz in 1857. He amassed a collection of 120 unique bird species in the vicinity of Orizaba, including areas such as Tuxpango, Tehuipango. His keeping of slaty vireo brought attention as its green color stood out among its genus.

He died in Orizaba in 1877.

References

Bibliography

1808 births
1877 deaths
Italian ornithologists
19th-century Italian botanists
People from Hvar